Aqua Paradise Water Park (Аква Парадайз Несебър) is an aquapark in the historic Nesebar city in Bulgaria, Sunny Beach resort.

The aquapark was founded in 2006 and its area is 46,000 square meters.

https://aquaparknessebar.bg/en/order/== See also ==
List of hotels in Bulgaria

References

External links 
Homepage
Location on Google Maps.

Water parks in Bulgaria
Sunny Beach